Caenis punctata is a species of small squaregilled mayfly in the family Caenidae. It is found in Central America and North America.

References

Mayflies
Articles created by Qbugbot
Insects described in 1931